Amine Amamou is a Moroccan footballer. He usually plays as forward. Amamou is currently attached to Kawkab Marrakech.

References

Moroccan footballers
1987 births
Living people
Sportspeople from Marrakesh
Kawkab Marrakech players
Botola players
Association football forwards